Edward Austin Kelly (April 3, 1892 – August 30, 1969) was a businessman and politician from Chicago, Illinois. A Democrat, he was most notable for his service in the United States House of Representatives from 1931 to 1943 and 1945 to 1947.

Biography
Kelly was born in Chicago, Illinois on April 3, 1892, the son of John J. and Nellie (O'Connor) Kelly. He attended the public schools of Chicago, including Longfellow School and Lake High School. In 1911, Kelly graduated from Orr's Business College in Chicago. He played semi-professional baseball for teams in Chicago, Normal, Lemont, Aurora, and DeKalb from 1912 to 1916.

From 1916 to 1920, Kelly was employed as an accountant with the Illinois Steel Corporation. During World War I he served in the Battery D, 332nd Field Artillery Regiment, a unit of the 86th Division. He was in the United States Army from 1917 to 1919 and attained the rank of sergeant. After his military service, Kelly engaged in the real estate and insurance businesses as the owner and operator of E. A. Kelly Co.

A Democrat, Kelly became active in local politics and was elected president of the 32nd Ward Democratic Association. In 1930, Kelly was elected to the United States House of Representatives. He was reelected five times, and served from March 4, 1931, to January 3, 1943. He was an unsuccessful candidate for reelection in 1942. After leaving Congress, Kelly worked as executive assistant to the chief justice of the Chicago municipal court and served as a member of the Chicago Planning Commission.

In 1944, Kelly was again elected to Congress. He served one term, January 3, 1945, to January 3, 1947. He was an unsuccessful candidate for reelection in 1946. After the end of his final term, Kelly returned to the real estate business.

Kelly died in Chicago on August 30, 1969. He was interred at Saint Mary Catholic Cemetery in Evergreen Park, Illinois.

Family
In 1922, Kelly married RoseMay R. Eulert. They were married until his death in 1969. They were the parents of two sons and a daughter—Edward A. Kelly Jr., Robert J. Kelly, and Rosemary.

References

External links
 Retrieved on January 21, 2008

1892 births
1969 deaths
Politicians from Chicago
United States Army personnel of World War I
United States Army soldiers
Democratic Party members of the United States House of Representatives from Illinois
20th-century American politicians